David Grogono (born 1 August 1965) is a Caymanian windsurfer. He competed in the men's Mistral One Design event at the 1996 Summer Olympics.

References

External links
 
 

1965 births
Living people
Caymanian windsurfers
Caymanian male sailors (sport)
Olympic sailors of the Cayman Islands
Sailors at the 1996 Summer Olympics – Mistral One Design
Place of birth missing (living people)